Khamlillal "Kanti" Shah (13 October 1920 – May 1989) was an Indian swimmer. He competed in the men's 100 metre backstroke at the 1948 Summer Olympics and the 1952 Summer Olympics and the water polo tournament at the 1952 Summer Olympics.

References

External links
 

1920 births
1989 deaths
Swimmers from Mumbai
Indian male swimmers
Indian male backstroke swimmers
Indian male medley swimmers
Indian male water polo players
Olympic swimmers of India
Olympic water polo players of India
Swimmers at the 1948 Summer Olympics
Swimmers at the 1952 Summer Olympics
Water polo players at the 1952 Summer Olympics
Asian Games medalists in swimming
Asian Games medalists in water polo
Asian Games gold medalists for India
Asian Games silver medalists for India
Asian Games bronze medalists for India
Water polo players at the 1951 Asian Games
Swimmers at the 1951 Asian Games
Medalists at the 1951 Asian Games
20th-century Indian people